Sophie Beau is a French humanitarian. She is the co-founder and general manager of SOS Méditerranée. She lives in Marseille.

Biography
Sophie Beau was born in Tours.

Her father, Bertrand, is a doctor and her mother, Christiane, is the director of a neighborhood social center. They live in Preuilly-sur-Claise (Indre-et-Loire) where they have set up a reception group for refugees.

She studied anthropology and political science in Paris, and got involved in literacy activities in an African household. In Mali, she studied the impact of migration on development projects.

With SOS Méditerranée
In March 2015, she met the German merchant marine captain  Klaus Vogel, with whom she launched SOS Méditerranée in May 2015; she is particularly involved in fundraising. Since March 2017, she has worked full time for SOS Méditerranée.

In 2018, according to the ranking by Vanity Fair, she was one of the most influential French personalities in the world.

In 2020, together with Klaus Vogel, she was recipient of an Aurora Humanitarian award.

References

Living people
French humanitarians
Year of birth missing (living people)